In mathematics, specifically in order theory and functional analysis, an ordered vector space  is said to be regularly ordered and its order is called regular if  is Archimedean ordered and the order dual of  distinguishes points in . 
Being a regularly ordered vector space is an important property in the theory of topological vector lattices.

Examples 

Every ordered locally convex space is regularly ordered. 
The canonical orderings of subspaces, products, and direct sums of regularly ordered vector spaces are again regularly ordered.

Properties 

See also

References

Bibliography

  
  

Functional analysis